The Hotel Lodi is a historic hotel located at 5 S. School St. in Lodi, California. Opened in 1915, the hotel was the largest and most significant hotel in northern San Joaquin County at the time. In addition to lodging, the hotel also hosted major social events, important business meetings, and large social club meetings. The hotel spurred growth in the city's hotel industry, and the presence of a large, modern hotel was credited with improving other areas of Lodi's economy as well. After the 1930s, the hotel began to decline, and by the late 1940s it no longer held its social and business functions. The hotel was later converted into a commercial building.

The Hotel Lodi was added to the National Register of Historic Places on September 29, 1995.

References

External links

Hotel buildings on the National Register of Historic Places in California
Renaissance Revival architecture in California
Hotel buildings completed in 1915
Buildings and structures in San Joaquin County, California
Lodi, California
National Register of Historic Places in San Joaquin County, California